() was the title used by Ante Pavelić, leader of the World War II Croatian movement Ustaše and of the Independent State of Croatia between 1941 and 1945.

Etymology and usage
The word was first recorded in a 16th-century dictionary compiled by Fausto Veranzio as a Croatian term for the Latin word princeps.

According to Vladimir Anić's Rječnik hrvatskoga jezika (Croatian Dictionary) and the Croatian Encyclopedic Dictionary the word comes from the adjective form poglavit, which can be loosely translated as 'first and foremost' or 'respectable, noble, honorable'. The adjective is in turn a compound of the Croatian prefix po- and the Proto-Slavic word stem glava 'head'.

Because it was used by the fascist regime, the title (which had originally meant "head" or "chief" but was rarely used before the 1930s) is never used today in its original sense as it became synonymous with Pavelić and took on negative connotations after World War II.

Other etymologically closely related words used in modern Croatian are "poglavar" (translated as "head of state" or "chief", used for heads of state) and "poglavica" (translated as "chief", in the sense of tribal leader).

Political role and context
Ante Pavelić first began using the title of "Poglavnik" when it was prescribed as the official title for the supreme leader of the Ustaše movement in the organization's founding charter in 1930, while he was in exile in Italy. The organization (whose name at the time meant simply "rebels" in Croatian but which also lost its original meaning in modern usage), was organized as a movement which sought to create an independent Croatian nation-state by means of armed struggle at the time when Croatia was part of the Kingdom of Yugoslavia.

Following the 1941 invasion of Yugoslavia and the establishment of the puppet state called Independent State of Croatia (commonly referred to by its Croatian-language initialism NDH), the title continued to be used for Pavelić, and its meaning was taken to have evolved into "the supreme leader". The title is therefore usually compared and considered equivalent to other titles of ethno-political leadership used at the time such as Führer (used by Adolf Hitler, which was itself modeled after Benito Mussolini's title Duce). As a result, "Poglavnik" is sometimes translated as "Führer" in English-language sources.

Legally, the exact role of the person carrying the title and its function were never officially stipulated in the constitution or in any other piece of legislation passed during NDH's existence. From May 1941 to October 1943 NDH was formally a kingdom and its formal head of state was King Tomislav II, an Italian Prince who was made King. so Ante Pavelić (and by extension the title of "Poglavnik") was de facto the country's Prime Minister. Following Italy's exit from World War II in September 1943, Pavelić took on the role equivalent to head of state, while Nikola Mandić was officially appointed Prime Minister of NDH. Thus, from September 1943 until the state's dissolution on 8 May 1945, the title can be taken to mean Head of State.

Regardless of the official role of the title, Pavelić had unlimited authority to pass decrees and appoint government ministers throughout the existence of NDH. Since the state ceased to exist in 1945, the title was never claimed by any successor. It continued to be used informally as a nickname for Pavelić during his post-war exile until his death in Madrid in 1959, and has become synonymous with him ever since.

See also
 Vrhovnik - A title used by Franjo Tuđman, the first President of modern-day Croatia
 Führer
 Duce
 Conducător
 Caudillo
 Vozhd

References

Heads of government
Heads of state
Titles of national or ethnic leadership
Independent State of Croatia
Titles held only by one person